Fort Ranger was a historical fort located near Rutland, Vermont, USA which dates back to 1778. The first commander was Captain Gideon Brownson. (Ann Story Chapter DAR) During the American Revolutionary war Whitcomb's Rangers were stationed there.

Works cited

Ann Story Chapter, Daughters of the American Revolution. Engraved stone drinking fountain. June 14, 1903. Rutland, VT. Visited August 27, 2013.

Ranger
Buildings and structures in Rutland, Vermont
1778 establishments in Vermont